Herzberg (Harz) station is a railway station in the municipality of Herzberg am Harz, located in the Göttingen district in Lower Saxony, Germany.

References

Railway stations in Lower Saxony
Buildings and structures in Göttingen (district)